Status Grand Prix is a former motorsport team registered in Canada.

Team history
Based in Silverstone the team was formed in 2005 to run the A1 Team Ireland franchise in the new A1 Grand Prix series. The team's founders were former Jordan Grand Prix Executive Mark Gallagher and Dublin businessman Mark Kershaw. Later shareholders included former Formula One driver David Kennedy, John Hynes and Teddy Yip Jr., whose father Teddy Yip owned the Theodore Racing Formula One team. They also ran the A1 Team Canada operation in 2007–08 and also assisted A1 Team Netherlands in 2008–09, the season in which Team Ireland won the championship title.

In 2010, Status Grand Prix competed in the inaugural GP3 Series finishing second in the team championship. Gary Anderson led the technical side of the team. At the end of the 2015 season, Status withdrew from the championship.

In 2014, Status Grand Prix acquired the Malaysian team of Tony Fernandes, EQ8 Caterham Racing, for the 2015 GP2 Series season, but participated in the last meeting of the 2014 GP2 Series season under the name of Caterham.

Status first raced officially in the 2015 GP2 Series season with Marlon Stockinger and Richie Stanaway as their drivers, with Oliver Rowland standing in for Stanaway in the final two rounds. Stanaway gave the team victories in the sprint races at Monaco and Sochi.

Status Grand Prix ended its participation in motor racing prior to the 2016 season.

Series results

GP2 Series

In detail
(key) (Races in bold indicate pole position) (Races in italics indicate fastest lap)

GP3 Series

In detail 
(key) (Races in bold indicate pole position) (Races in italics indicate fastest lap)

A1 Grand Prix

Timeline

Footnotes

References

External links
 

Irish auto racing teams
Canadian auto racing teams
Auto racing teams established in 2005
2005 establishments in the United Kingdom
A1 Grand Prix racing teams
GP3 Series teams
European Le Mans Series teams
GP2 Series teams
24 Hours of Le Mans teams
Auto racing teams disestablished in 2016